Čitluk is a village in Serbia. It is situated in the Ljubovija municipality, in the Mačva District of Central Serbia. The village had a Serb ethnic majority and a population of 941 in 2002.

Historical population

1948: 631
1953: 679
1961: 637
1971: 669
1981: 530
1991: 858
2002: 941

References

See also
List of places in Serbia

Populated places in Mačva District
Ljubovija